Turania is a genus of moths of the family Crambidae.

Species
Turania pentodontalis (Erschoff, 1874)
Turania russulalis (Christoph, 1877)

References

Natural History Museum Lepidoptera genus database

Odontiinae
Crambidae genera
Taxa named by Émile Louis Ragonot